Clayton J. Halverson was a Democratic member of the South Dakota House of Representatives from 2005 to 2008.

External links
South Dakota Legislature – Clayton Halverson official SD House website

Project Vote Smart – Representative Clayton Halverson (SD) profile
Follow the Money – Clayton Halverson
2006 2004 campaign contributions

Democratic Party members of the South Dakota House of Representatives
Living people
People from Veblen, South Dakota
Year of birth missing (living people)